Natalija Ugrina is a  Croatian-American actress, fashion model and influencer based in Los Angeles, California.

Early life and career
Natalija Ugrina was born in Croatia. Her mother, Ketrin Buljević, is a writer and poet, and her father Nenad Ugrina is a diplomat. She started her career at the age of 16 from Elite Model Management, an international modeling agency. She worked various fashion designers and walked Fashion show in different parts of the world. She also appeared in some notable publications such as Vogue Italia, Elle (magazine) and Harper's Bazaar. In 2010, she moved to Los Angeles to study acting at Lee Strasberg Theatre and Film Institute.

Ugrina is also active as an Instagram and TikTok influencer, with a total of 1.5 million followers.

Filmography
Fight of Fury (Upcoming), as Ruxanda
A Life Well Lived (2018), as Amela Krajicevic
College Ball Movie (2018), as Megan Haley
Caravaggio and My Mother the Pope (2018), as Babylon Princess / Caravaggio Madonna
The Other (2017), as Milena
Zen Expressionism #3 Projection (2016), as Barbara
L'Antoinette (2015), as Irena
Strangers (2015), as Adair's Companion
Hollywood Adventures (2015), as Hot model
The Giant Deer (2014), as student
Time Hunter (2014), as Zoe
The Gambler (2014 film), as Masseuse
Pawn Sacrifice (2014), as Bikini model
Starry Eyes (2014), as Audition Girl
She Looks So Perfect (2014), as model
Crown Point (2013), as Ariana

TV Series
Murder in the First (TV series) (2014), as Brooke

Award Shows
Côte d'Azur WebFest Awards Show 1st Edition (2019)

As Producer
A Life Well Lived (2018)

Discography
Baby Blue' 2015 with Action Bronson feat Chance the Rapper
'She Looks So Perfect' 2014 with 5 Seconds of Summer
'Daddy Sh*t' with Knox

References

External links
 
 

Living people
Croatian actresses
Year of birth missing (living people)
Actors from Split, Croatia
Models from Split, Croatia